Toba Qom is a Guaicuruan language spoken in South America by the Toba people. The language is known by a variety of names including Toba, Qom or Kom, Chaco Sur, and Toba Sur. In Argentina, it is most widely dispersed in the eastern regions of the provinces of Formosa and Chaco, where the majority of the approximately 19,810 (2000 WCD) speakers reside. The language is distinct from Toba-Pilagá and Paraguayan Toba-Maskoy. There are also 146 Toba speakers in Bolivia where it is known as Qom and in Paraguay where it is also known as Qob or Toba-Qom.

In 2010, the province of Chaco in Argentina declared Qom as one of four provincial official languages alongside Spanish and the indigenous Moqoit and Wichí.

History

Many indigenous people from Chaco remained nomads until the nineteenth century. Their economy was based on hunting and gathering. They were organized in groups called bandas (Spanish: "bands"), made up of the union of large families. They formed larger groups called tribus (Spanish: "tribes"), based on their dialect variant, family ties and marriage. In the twentieth century, they were forced into labour and this caused them to be displaced to different areas. This is when they started adopting a sedentary lifestyle.

Linguistic Family

There are seven linguistic families and two independent languages among the different indigenous languages in Chaco. The Toba language belongs to the Guaycurú family, together with pilagá (Formosa province), mocoví (South of Chaco and North of Santa Fe), and others. Nowadays, there is a dispute among linguists whether these can be considered individual languages, or different dialects due to their similarities and intelligibility. However, most of the indigenous languages in Chaco are not homogeneous. There are differences as regards sounds and vocabulary. Thus, speakers notice these differences and sometimes communication can be affected inside a community. This is partly due to the influence of other languages.
Even though most indigenous communities in Chaco are bilingual, since they speak their indigenous mother tongue and the official language of the country (Spanish, Portuguese or Paraguayan Guaraní), their indigenous languages can be considered endangered due to lack of transmission from generation to generation. Many indigenous people are moving more and more to urban areas and their jobs and social activities require the predominant language of the country in which they live.
Speakers consider themselves as ‘Qom’ and their language as qom l'aqtaqa (Qom language). Most of the Qom population live in the provinces of Chaco and Formosa, Argentina. There are also communities in Santa, Rosario and Gran Buenos Aires. According to Klein 19781, there are three different dialectal varieties within the Toba Language: no'olxaxanaq in Pampa del Indio (Chaco), lañaxashec in Machagai (Chaco), and tacshec (Formosa).

Grammar

Nouns 
Some nouns can function as adjectives or nouns. E.g.:
 Man — Talé
 Woman — Aló 
 Good or goodness — Noen  
 Bad or badness — Scauen  

Sometimes, the particle ta is added to the adjective in order to combine it with a pronoun:
 Good — Noen 
 Me good  — Ayen-noen-ta 
 Bad — Scauen
 You bad — Alian- scauen-ta 

Some other times, they are used indifferently, with or without the particle ta.
Nouns usually do not have declinations and, therefore, both singular and plural nouns share the same endings. It is only through the verb and circumstancials in the sentence that case and number are known.

In addition, the particle quotarien means ‘why’ or ‘for what cause, reason or motive’:
For God's sake — Dios quotarien

Superlative and Comparative Forms 
To make the comparative form, the Qom people add the particle mano before a noun functioning as an adjective:
 Good — Noentá; Better — Mano-noentá
 Bad — Scauenta; Worse — Mano-noentá
 Sick — Saygot; Sicker — Mano-saygot

For the superlative form, the particle mano is added before the adjective and the letter u goes after it:
 Good — Noenta; Very good — Noentaú
 The best — Mano-noentá-ú
 The worst — Mano-scauentq-ú
 The sickest — Mano-saygoth-desaú

Pronouns 
In the Toba language, the following pronouns can be found:

Singular
 Ayén — I
 Ahan — you
 Edá — that one

Plural
 Comi — we
 Camí — you
 Mnavaso — these
 Edava — those

Pronouns, just like nouns, lack declinations:
 The bread is mine — Nadená ayén
 The arrow is mine — Tigná ayén 

Place demonstrative pronouns are:
 Aña — here
 Dequeñá — from here
 Edá — there
 Dequedá — over there
 Meliuagé — where
 Massayge — where, through which way
 Mehuá — where to
 Meticage — from where

But to make questions, they say:
 Menagé — Where is it?
 Menagé Dios? — Where is God?
 Metaygé yiocti? — Which way did the dog take?
 Yritaygé enrayó? — Where did the horse go?

Verbs 
This language does not have the verb 'to be' or perfective and imperfective aspect. So, in order to make a perfective sentence, there is subject-adjective agreement:
 I am good — Ayen noentá, which means 'I good'.
 You are bad — Ahan scauentá, which means 'you bad'.
 The man is sick — Yalé saygoth, which means, 'the man sick'.

The particle sa preceding any verb denotes negation:
 Sahayaten — I know
 Sasahayaten — I do not know
 Sauan — I see
 Sasauan — I do not see
 Sahayá — I hear
 Sasahayá — I do not hear

The first and second person pronouns are usually omitted:
 Siquehé — I eat
 Saic — I leave

Number and person are marked by different particles preceding or postponing the verb. Each verb behaves differently. For example, the second person is sometimes realized with the particle ma, majtia, aise, maj, etc.

Tenses are reduced to the following:
 Simple present tense of the Indicative mood
 Past tense of the Indicative mood
 Future time
 Infinitive
 Present Progressive

This is because time is not restricted to verb tenses, but it depends on the adverb that is postponed to the verb.
In order to make sentences in the Present Progressive tense, the particles tapec or tápeyá must be added after the verb (they mark the verb in the progressive form). E.g.: I eating — illic tapec or tapeyá.

Prepositions 
Some prepositions proceed the phrase, like guasigén, which means 'up' or 'on top of.' E.g.: On top of the house — Guasigén nohie.

Some others are postponed, such as lori (outside) and laloro (inside). E.g.: Inside and outside the house — Nohíe laloro, nohie lorí

Adverbs 
There are adverbs of manner, place and time.
The Toba language lacks adverbs that derive from adjectives, such as ‘badly’ and ‘nicely’, but they explain this by using adjectives. Instead of saying ‘The boy did it nicely,’ they say ñocolca noenta (Nice boy), and instead of saying ‘The man has behaved badly,’ they say Yahole scauen (Bad man).

They have the following adverbs of place:
 Idivagé — Where?
 Nenná — Here
 Naquedá — There
 Iditaigé — Where is it or where has it gone?
 Igamaditaygem — Where has it gone to?
 Igatíacagé — Where does it come from?
 Igadeaygé — Where do you go?
 Edá — There
 Idealagí cadeanoví — When did you arrive?

Time adverbs are the following:
 Comennetatá — in the morning
 Mavit — in the afternoon
 Nahagát — at midday
 Ñapé — at night
 Ninogoni — at sunset
 Ninogón sigem — at sunrise
 Yecahá — so
 Nagí — now
 Nagua ahositá — I go this year

Counting System
The Tobas have only four numbers:
 One — Nathedac
 Only one — Nathedac colec
 Two — Cacayni or Nivoca
 Three — Cacaynilia
 Four — Nalotapegat

They count till ten by duplicating or triplicating the numbers:
 Five, or three and two — Nivoca cacaynilia
 Six, or two times three — Cacayni cacaynilia
 Seven, or one and two times three — Nathedac cacayni cacaynilia
 Eight, or two fours — Nivoca nalotapegat
 Nine, or two fours and one — Nivoca nalotapegat natedac

Phonology

Consonants 

 /p t k q/ can have aspirated allophones [pʰ tʰ kʰ qʰ] in word-initial position, and unreleased [p̚ t̚ k̚ q̚] in word-final position.
 Voiced stops /ɡ ɢ/ may also be heard as fricative [ ] sounds.
 Affricates /t͡ʃ d͡ʒ/ can also be heard as palatal stops [ ].
 /n/ can be heard as [] word-finally when preceded by a glottal stop /ʔ/.
 /ɾ/ is heard as a trill [] when following a /t/.
 /w/ can be heard as a labiodental fricative [], when preceding or following /i/.
 /s l n/ can also have tense allophones as [sː lː nː].

Vowels 

 A nasalized [ã] occurs when preceded and followed by /h/.

Sample text
The following is a sample text in Toba Qom of Article 1 of the Universal Declaration of Human Rights:

Toba Qom:

Translation:
All human beings are born free and equal in dignity and rights. They are endowed with reason and conscience and should act towards one another in a spirit of brotherhood.

References

External links
Toba (Intercontinental Dictionary Series)
 Argentinian Languages Collection of Salvador Bucca at the Archive of the Indigenous Languages of Latin America, including audio recordings of stories, songs, sermons, and conversations in Toba.

Guaicuruan languages
Languages of Argentina
Languages of Paraguay
Languages of Bolivia
Chaco linguistic area